James Burnham (November 22, 1905 – July 28, 1987) was an American philosopher and political theorist. He chaired the New York University Department of Philosophy; his first book was An Introduction to Philosophical Analysis (1931). Burnham became a prominent Trotskyist activist in the 1930s. He later rejected Marxism and became an even more influential theorist of the political right as a leader of the American conservative movement. His book The Managerial Revolution, published in 1941, speculated on the future of capitalism. Burnham was an editor and a regular contributor to William F. Buckley's conservative magazine National Review on a variety of topics. He rejected containment of the Soviet Union and called for the rollback of communism worldwide.

Biography

Early life

Born in Chicago, Illinois, on November 22, 1905, James Burnham was the son of Claude George Burnham, an English immigrant and executive with the Burlington Railroad. James was raised as a Roman Catholic but rejected Catholicism as a college student, professing atheism for much of his life (although returning to the church shortly before his death). He graduated at the top of his class at Princeton University before attending Balliol College, Oxford University, where his professors included J. R. R. Tolkien and Martin D'Arcy. In 1929, he became a professor of philosophy at New York University.

In 1934, he married Marcia Lightner.

Trotskyism
In 1933, along with Sidney Hook, Burnham helped to organize the American Workers Party led by the Dutch-born pacifist minister A. J. Muste. Burnham supported the 1934 merger with the Communist League of America which formed the US Workers Party. In 1935, he allied with the Trotskyist wing of that party and favored fusion with the Socialist Party of America. During this period, he became a friend to Leon Trotsky. Writing for Partisan Review, Burnham was also an important influence on writers including Dwight Macdonald and Philip Rahv. However, Burnham's engagement with Trotskyism was short-lived: from 1937 a number of disagreements came to the fore.

In 1937, the Trotskyists were expelled from the Socialist Party, an action which led to the formation of the Socialist Workers Party (SWP) at the end of the year. Inside the SWP, Burnham allied with Max Shachtman in a faction fight over the position of the SWP's majority faction, led by James P. Cannon and backed by Leon Trotsky, defending the Soviet Union as a degenerated workers state against the incursions of imperialism. Shachtman and Burnham, especially after witnessing the Nazi–Soviet pact of 1939 and the invasions of Poland, Latvia, Lithuania, and Estonia by Joseph Stalin's regime, as well as the Soviet invasion of Finland in November 1939, came to contend that the USSR was a new form of imperialistic class society and was thus not worthy of even critical support from the socialist movement.

In February 1940 he wrote Science and Style: A Reply to Comrade Trotsky, in which he broke with dialectical materialism. In this text he responds to Trotsky's request to draw his attention to "those works which should supplant the system of dialectic materialism for the proletariat" by referring to Principia Mathematica by Russell and Whitehead and "the scientists, mathematicians and logicians now cooperating in the new Encyclopedia of Unified Science".

After a protracted discussion inside the SWP, in which the factions argued their case in a series of heated internal discussion bulletins, the special 3rd National Convention of the organization in early April 1940 decided the question in favor of the Cannon majority by a vote of 55–31. Even though the majority sought to avoid a split by offering to continue the debate and to allow proportional representation of the minority on the party's governing National Committee, Shachtman, Burnham, and their supporters resigned from the SWP to launch their own organization, again called the Workers Party.

This break also marked the end of Burnham's participation in the radical movement, however. On May 21, 1940, he addressed a letter to the National Committee of the Workers Party resigning from the organization. In it he made it clear the distance he had moved away from Marxism:

In 1941, Burnham wrote a book analyzing the development of economics and society as he saw it, called The Managerial Revolution: What is Happening in the World. The book was included in Life magazine's list of the 100 outstanding books of 1924–1944.

OSS and National Review

During World War II, Burnham took a leave from NYU to work for the Office of Strategic Services (OSS), a forerunner of the Central Intelligence Agency. Recommended by George F. Kennan, Burnham was invited to lead the semi-autonomous "Political and Psychological Warfare" division of the Office of Policy Coordination.

Subsequently, during the Cold War, he called for an aggressive strategy against the Soviet Union. A contributor to The Freeman in the early 1950s, he considered the magazine too focused on economic issues, though it presented a wide range of opinion on the Soviet threat. In The Struggle for the World (1947), he called for common citizenship between the United States, Great Britain, and the British dominions, as well as a "World Federation" against communism. Burnham thought in terms of a hegemonic world, instead of a balance of power:

A World Federation initiated and led by the United States would be, we have recognized, a World Empire. In this imperial federation, the United States, with a monopoly of atomic weapons, would hold a preponderance of decisive material power over all the rest of the world. In world politics, that is to say, there would not be a balance of power.

In 1955, he helped William F. Buckley Jr. found National Review magazine, which from the start took positions in foreign policy consistent with Burnham's own. In the National Review, he wrote a column titled "Third World War," which referred to the Cold War. Burnham became a lifelong contributor to the journal, and Buckley referred to him as "the number one intellectual influence on National Review since the day of its founding." His approach to foreign policy has caused some to regard him as the first "neoconservative," although Burnham's ideas have been an important influence on both the paleoconservative and neoconservative factions of the American Right.

In 1983, President Ronald Reagan awarded him the Presidential Medal of Freedom.

In early November 1978 he suffered a stroke which affected his health and short-term memory. He died of kidney and liver cancer at home in Kent, Connecticut, on July 28, 1987. He was buried in Kent on August 1, 1987.

Ideas

The Managerial Revolution
Burnham's seminal work, The Managerial Revolution (1941), theorized about the future of world capitalism based upon its development in the interwar period. Burnham weighed three possibilities: (1) that capitalism was a permanent form of social and economic organization and would continue indefinitely; (2) that it was temporary and destined by its nature to collapse and be replaced by socialism; (3) that it was currently being transformed into some non-socialist future form of society. Since capitalism had a more or less definite beginning in the 14th century, it could not be regarded as an immutable and permanent form. Moreover, in the last years of previous economic systems such as those of Ancient Greece and the Roman Empire, mass unemployment was "a symptom that a given type of social organization is just about finished." The worldwide mass unemployment of the depression era thus indicated that capitalism was itself "not going to continue much longer."

Analyzing the emerging forms of society around the world, Burnham saw certain commonalities between the economic formations of Nazi Germany, Stalinist Russia, and America under Roosevelt's New Deal. Burnham argued that in the short period since the First World War, a new society had emerged in which a social group or class of "managers" had waged a "drive for social dominance, for power and privilege, for the position of ruling class." For at least the previous decade, there had grown in America the idea of a "separation of ownership and control" of the modern corporation, notably expounded in The Modern Corporation and Private Property by Berle and Means. Burnham expanded this concept, arguing that whether ownership was corporate and private or statist and governmental, the essential demarcation between the ruling elite (executives and managers backed by bureaucrats and functionaries) and the mass of society was not ownership so much as control of the means of production.

Burnham emphasized that "New Dealism", as he called it, "is not, let me repeat, a developed, systematized managerial ideology." Still, this ideology had contributed to American capitalism's moving in a "managerial direction":

In its own more confused, less advanced way, New Dealism too has spread abroad the stress on the state as against the individual, planning as against private enterprise, jobs (even if relief jobs) against opportunities, security against initiative, "human rights" against "property rights." There can be no doubt that the psychological effect of New Dealism has been what the capitalists say it has been: to undermine public confidence in capitalist ideas and rights and institutions. Its most distinctive features help to prepare the minds of the masses for the acceptance of the managerial social structure.

In June 1941, a hostile review of The Managerial Revolution by Socialist Workers Party loyalist Joseph Hansen in the SWP's theoretical magazine accused Burnham of surreptitiously lifting the central ideas of his book from the Italian Bruno Rizzi's La Bureaucratisation du Monde (1939). Despite certain similarities, there is no evidence Burnham knew of this book beyond Leon Trotsky's brief references to it in his debates with Burnham. Burnham was influenced by the idea of bureaucratic collectivism of the Trotskyist Yvan Craipeau, but Burnham took a distinct conservative Machiavellian rather than a Marxist viewpoint, an important philosophical difference which Burnham explored in greater detail in The Machiavellians.

Later writings
In The Machiavellians, he developed his theory that the emerging new élite would prosper better if it retained some democratic trappings—political opposition, a free press, and a controlled "circulation of the élites."

His 1964 book Suicide of the West became a classic text for the post-war conservative movement in American politics, proclaiming Burnham's new interest in traditional moral values, classical liberal economics and anti-communism. He defined political ideologies as syndromes afflicting their proponents with various internal contradictions. His works greatly influenced paleoconservative author Sam Francis, who wrote two books about Burnham, and based his political theories upon the "managerial revolution" and the resulting managerial state.

In fiction 
British writer George Orwell was inspired by Burnham's The Managerial Revolution and his explanation of power, which informed Orwell's 1949 novel Nineteen Eighty-Four. Orwell noted in 1945, "For Burnham's geographical picture of the new world has turned out to be correct. More and more obviously the surface of the earth is being parceled off into three great empires ... " The superpowers of Oceania, Eurasia, and Eastasia in the novel are partly influenced by Burnham's assessment of Roosevelt's America, Nazi Germany and the Soviet Union as being managerial states. In 1946 Orwell, summarized Burnham's managerial revolution and outlined the geopolitical landscape of Nineteen Eighty-Four:

The rulers of this new society will be the people who effectively control the means of production: that is, business executives, technicians, bureaucrats and soldiers, lumped together by Burnham, under the name of 'managers'. These people will eliminate the old capitalist class, crush the working class, and so organise society that all power and economic privilege remain in their own hands. Private property rights will be abolished, but common ownership will not be established. The new 'managerial' societies will not consist of a patchwork of small, independent states, but of great super-states grouped round the main industrial centres in Europe, Asia, and America. These super-states will fight among themselves for possession of the remaining uncaptured portions of the earth, but will probably be unable to conquer one another completely. Internally, each society will be hierarchical, with an aristocracy of talent at the top and a mass of semi-slaves at the bottom."

While Orwell partly agreed with Burnham's analysis, he never fully accepted Burnham's attitude towards Machiavellian managerial power. This unresolved thought helped to inspire the character of O'Brien, who talks about power and regimes in Nineteen Eighty-Four.

Works
Books
 Introduction to Philosophical Analysis (with Philip Wheelwright). New York: Henry Holt and Company, 1932.
 The Managerial Revolution: What is Happening in the World. New York: John Day Co., 1941.
 The Machiavellians: Defenders of Freedom. New York: John Day Co., 1943. .
 The Struggle for the World. New York: John Day Co., 1947.
 The Case for De Gaulle: A Dialogue Between André Malraux and James Burnham. New York: Random House, 1948.
 The Coming Defeat of Communism. New York: John Day Co., 1949.
 Containment or Liberation? An Inquiry into the Aims of United States Foreign Policy. New York: John Day Co., 1953.
 The Web of Subversion: Underground Networks. New York: John Day Co., 1954.
 Congress and the American Tradition. Chicago: Regnery, 1959. .
 Bear and Dragon: What is the Relation Between Moscow and Peking? New York: National Review, in cooperation with the American-Asian Exchange, 1960.
 Suicide of the West: An Essay on the Meaning and Destiny of Liberalism. New York: John Day Co., 1964. 
 The War We Are In: The Last Decade and the Next. New Rochelle, NY: Arlington House, 1967.

Book contributions
 Introduction. In: Dobriansky, Lev E. Veblenism: A New Critique. Washington: Public Affairs Press, 1957.

Pamphlets
 War and the Workers (as John West). New York: Workers Party of the United States, 1935. alternate link
 Why Did They "Confess"? A Study of the Radek-Piatakov Trial. New York: Pioneer Publishers, 1937. alternate link.
 The People's Front: The New Betrayal. New York: Pioneer Publishers, 1937. alternate link
 How to Fight War: Isolation, Collective Security, Relentless Class Struggle? New York: Socialist Workers Party & Young Peoples Socialist League (4th Internationalists), 1938.
 Let the People Vote on War! New York: Pioneer Publishers, 1939?.
 In Defense of Marxism (Against the Petty-Bourgeois Opposition) (with Leon Trotsky, Joseph Hansen and William Warde). New York: Pioneer Publishers, 1942.

Public speaking
 Why Does a Country Go Communist? An address delivered at the Indian Congress for Cultural Freedom on March 31, 1951. Bombay: Democratic Research Service, 1951.

Selected articles
 "The Case Against Adlai Stevenson." American Mercury, Vol. 76, October 1952, pp. 11-19.
 "Can Washington Conduct Political Warfare?" American Mercury, December 1952, pp. 10-24.
 "Does ADA Run the New Frontier?" National Review, Vol. 14, No. 18, May 7, 1963, pp. 355-362.

See also
 William F. Buckley Jr.

References

Further reading
 John P. Diggins, Up From Communism. New York: Columbia University Press, 1975.
 Samuel Francis, Power and History, The Political Thought of James Burnham. London: Claridge Press, 1999.
 Grant Havers, "James Burnham's Elite Theory and the Postwar American Right," Telos 154 (Spring 2011): 29–50.
 Benjamin Guy Hoffman, The Political Thought of James Burnham. PhD dissertation. University of Michigan, 1969.
 Daniel Kelly, James Burnham and the Struggle for the World: A Life. Wilmington, DE: ISI Books, 2002.
 C. Wright Mills and Hans Gerth, "A Marx for the Managers", 1942. Reprinted in Power, Politics, and People: The Collected Essays of C. Wright Mills edited by Irving Horowitz. Oxford: Oxford University Press, 1967.
 George Orwell, "Second Thoughts on James Burnham," Polemic, No. 3, May 1946.
 Paul Sweezy, "The Illusion of the 'Managerial Revolution,'" Science & Society, vol. 6, no. 1 (Winter 1942), pp. 1–23. In JSTOR.

External links

 
 James Burnham Internet Archive at Marxists Internet Archive
 Register of the James Burnham Papers, 1928-1983, the Online Archive of California (OAC) initiative of the California Digital Library
 Obituary of James Burnham, National Review, September 11, 1987
 Lenin's heir. By Victor Serge. At Victor Serge Archive  (Marxists Internet Archive)
 James Burnham, the First Cold Warrior by Francis P. Sempa

 

1905 births
1987 deaths
20th-century American male writers
20th-century American non-fiction writers
Alumni of Balliol College, Oxford
American communists
American political philosophers
American Trotskyists
Converts to Roman Catholicism from atheism or agnosticism
Critics of dialectical materialism
History of United States isolationism
Members of the American Workers Party
Members of the Socialist Party of America
Members of the Socialist Workers Party (United States)
Members of the Workers Party (United States)
Members of the Workers Party of the United States
National Review people
New Right (United States)
People from Chicago
People of the Office of Strategic Services
Presidential Medal of Freedom recipients
Princeton University alumni
New York University faculty
Writers from Chicago
American male non-fiction writers
Catholics from Illinois
Former Marxists
American anti-communists
People associated with the magazine "Kultura"